Visitors to the Republic of the Congo must obtain a visa from one of the Republic of the Congo diplomatic missions unless they come from one of the visa exempt countries or countries that can obtain a visa on arrival.

Visa policy map

Visa exemption 
Citizens of the following 5 countries who hold a biometric passport can visit Republic of Congo without a visa for up to 90 days:

Visa not required for citizens of  provided their normal passports are endorsed "For Public Affairs".

Visa not required for holders of a V.I.P Invitation letter.

Holders of diplomatic or service category passports issued to nationals of Brazil, China and Russia do not require a visa as well as holders of diplomatic passports of Portugal and Turkey.

Visa on arrival 
Citizens of the following countries can obtain a visa on arrival:

Transit 
Passengers with a confirmed onward ticket for a flight to a third country on the same calendar day. They must stay in the international transit area of the airport and have documents required for the next destination.

eVisa
In April 2019 Congolese authorities announced a plan to introduce electronic visas in August 2019. Visa applications can already be submitted online at the Republic of the Congo embassy in France website.

See also 

 Visa requirements for Republic of the Congo citizens

References 

Republic of the Congo
Foreign relations of the Republic of the Congo